Meu is an album released by fado singer Cuca Roseta. It was released in November 2020 by Anahata Musica.

Track listing
 Preto E Branco	
 Chiça Penico	
 Finalmente	
 Bairro Português	
 Não Sei De Onde (Versão Guitarra)	
 Negrita	
 Grito	
 Meu	
 Roda Da Saia	
 À Porta Do Beijo	
 Maria	
 Amor De Domingo	
 Não Sei De Onde (Versão Piano)

References

Cuca Roseta albums
2020 albums
Portuguese-language albums